San Pedro Street station is an at-grade light rail station on the A Line of the Los Angeles Metro Rail system. The station is located in the median of Washington Boulevard near its intersection with San Pedro Street, after which the station is named, in Los Angeles, California.

Service

Station layout

Hours and frequency 
A Line trains run every day between approximately 4:00 a.m. and 12:30 am. Trains operate every ten minutes during peak hours Monday through Friday, every twelve minutes during the daytime on weekdays and all day on the weekends after approximately 8 a.m. (with a 15/20-minute headway early Saturday and Sunday mornings). Night service is every 20 minutes.

Connections 
, the following connections are available: 
 Los Angeles Metro Bus: 
 LADOT DASH: E, King East
 Montebello Bus Lines: 50

References 

A Line (Los Angeles Metro) stations
Railway stations in the United States opened in 1990
1990 establishments in California